The Château de Tours is a castle located in Tours, Indre-et-Loire, France.

Built in the 11th century, the building displayed an architecture of the Carolingian period, and was the residence of the Lords of France.

Until the 2000s, the Royal Castle of Tours was used as an aquarium where about 1,500 fish of 200 different species could be seen. It also served as Grévin museum. The castle was classified as monument historique on 20 August 1913.

Currently, the building houses contemporary exhibitions of paintings and photographs (organized by Le Jeu de Paume), including works by Joan Miró, Daniel Buren, Nadar, Robert Capa.

References

Buildings and structures completed in the 11th century
Buildings and structures in Tours, France
Tours
Tours
Museums in Indre-et-Loire
Art museums and galleries in France
Local museums in France
11th-century establishments in France
Royal residences in France